is a Japanese footballer who currently plays for Saturday Football Intl.

Career statistics

Club

Notes

References

1999 births
Living people
Japanese footballers
Japanese expatriate footballers
Association football defenders
Singapore Premier League players
Albirex Niigata Singapore FC players
Japanese expatriate sportspeople in Singapore
Expatriate footballers in Singapore
Japanese expatriate sportspeople in Taiwan
Expatriate footballers in Taiwan